Hemitrypa is an extinct genus of bryozoans that lived from the Devonian to the Permian period, belonging to the family Fenestellidae. Like some other fenestrate bryozoans, it produced a skeletal superstructure to protect the colony.

References

Prehistoric bryozoan genera
Stenolaemata